Yahoo! is a web services provider jointly by Apollo Global Management and Verizon Communications, and known for its web portal, search engine, and related services.

Yahoo may also refer to:

Arts and entertainment 
 Yahoo (Gulliver's Travels), creatures found in the book Gulliver's Travels by Jonathan Swift
 Yahoo, the name of the fictitious country which is the setting for Bertolt Brecht's 1936 play Round Heads and Pointed Heads
 Yahoo (band), a Brazilian rock band
 Yahoo! (song), a song from the 1988 album The Innocents by Erasure
 Yahoo (album), an Afghan album by Farhad Darya
 Yahoo Serious (born Greg Pead 1953), Australian filmmaker

Animals 
 Yahoo (bird), a popular name for the grey-crowned babbler
 Yahoo (horse), a successful National Hunt racehorse

Other uses 
 Yahoo! Inc. (2017–present), American technology company, parent company of the Yahoo! portal and the current incarnation of Yahoo! Inc.
 Yahoo! Inc. (1995–2017), the owner of Yahoo! until 2017 and the original incarnation of Yahoo! Inc.
 Yahoo Falls, Kentucky, a historic waterfall
 Yahoo Software, an American company unrelated to the internet content provider
 Altaba, the remainder and direct legal successor of the original iteration of "Yahoo! Inc." company after selling off their Internet business and brand
 Yahoo! Japan
 Yahoo boy, a nickname for a Nigerian 419 scammer
 A Ku Klux Klan term used in its tribunal organisations